Simeon Kipkemboi (born April 15, 1960) is a former sprinter from Kenya, who represented his native East African country twice at the Summer Olympics: in 1988 and 1992. He is best known for winning the gold medal in the men's 200 metres at the 1987 All-Africa Games.

Personal bests
100 metres – 10.2 (1989)
200 metres – 20.54 (1987)
400 metres – 44.93 (1990)

External links

sports-reference

1960 births
Living people
Kenyan male sprinters
Athletes (track and field) at the 1988 Summer Olympics
Athletes (track and field) at the 1990 Commonwealth Games
Athletes (track and field) at the 1992 Summer Olympics
Olympic athletes of Kenya
Commonwealth Games medallists in athletics
Commonwealth Games gold medallists for Kenya
Commonwealth Games bronze medallists for Kenya
African Games gold medalists for Kenya
African Games medalists in athletics (track and field)
Athletes (track and field) at the 1987 All-Africa Games
Medallists at the 1990 Commonwealth Games